Clontz is a surname. Notable people with the surname include:

Brad Clontz (born 1971), American baseball player
Dennis Clontz (1951–2004), American playwright, journalist, and screenwriter